"Graceful World" is a song by the Japanese J-pop group Every Little Thing, released as their nineteenth single on February 21, 2001. It was used as the theme song for the TV drama Big Wing.

Track listing
 Graceful World (Words - Kaori Mochida / music - Yasuo Ohtani)
 Graceful World (2 Fat GTR mix)
 Graceful World (Amazing mix)
 Graceful World (instrumental)

Chart positions

External links
 "Graceful World" information at Avex Network.
 "Graceful World" information at Oricon.

2001 singles
Every Little Thing (band) songs
Songs written by Kaori Mochida
Japanese television drama theme songs
2001 songs
Avex Trax singles